Mithankot also known as Kotmithan, is a city in Rajanpur District in Punjab, Pakistan. Mithankot is located on the west bank of the Indus River,  a short distance downstream from its junction with Panjnad River. Most of its inhabitants are Saraikis and Baloch. The city is noted for being the site of the tomb of the famous Sufi poet, Khawaja Ghulam Fareed.

Climate and economy

The climate is arid and desert-like, the average annual rainfall being only 4 inches (100 mm). Varying extremities in temperature depending on the season. To the south side is the great Indus River.

The cultivation of crops such as wheat, sugarcane, cotton and rice is enabled through irrigation from the canals from the Indus.

References

External links
Farid Mahal and the Mausoleum of Hadrat Khawajah Ghulam Farid

Populated places in Rajanpur District
Rajanpur District